Phatthalung Football Club (Thai สโมสรฟุตบอลจังหวัดพัทลุง ) is a Thai professional football club based in Phatthalung Province. The club is currently playing in the Thai League 3 Southern region.

Timeline

History of events of Phatthalung Football Club:

Stadium and locations

Seasons

Club officials

Players

Current squad

Honours

Domestic leagues
Regional League Division 2 Southern
 Runners-up (1) : 2011

References

External links 
 

Association football clubs established in 1998
Football clubs in Thailand
Phatthalung province
1998 establishments in Thailand